Stephanos Papadopoulos (born 1976) is a Greek-American poet.

Biography

Stephanos Papadopoulos was born in North Carolina and raised in Paris and Athens. He is the author of three poetry collections: The Black Sea (November 2012, Sheep Meadow Press), Hôtel-Dieu (2009, Sheep Meadow Press), and Lost Days (2001, Leviathan Press, UK / Rattapallax Press, NY). He is editor and co-translator (with Katerina Anghelaki-Rooke) of Derek Walcott's Selected Poems in Greek, published by Kastianiotis Press, 2007.  He was awarded a 2010 Civitella Ranieri Fellowship for The Black Sea and was the recipient of the 2014 Jeannette Haien Ballard Writer's Prize selected by Mark Strand.

Poetry Books
 Lost Days, Stephanos Papadopoulos, 2001 Leviathan Press, UK, Rattapallax Press, NY

 Hotel-Dieu, Stephanos Papadopoulos, 2009, Sheep Meadow Press, New York

   The Black Sea, Stephanos Papadopoulos, 2012

Translations 
 Selected Poems, Derek Walcott, 2006 Kastaniotis Editions, Athens, Greece

  Questi erano i nostri fragili eroi, Stephanos Papadopoulos, Italian translation: Matteo Campagnoli 2011, Edizione Casagrande

Critical References
"Writing this good, this modest in its stance toward important matters, is hard to find in contemporary poetry. Our poet historians are too often earnest documentarians, but Papadopoulos goes for the life inside his stories, writing with an ear for the deeper music of grief."  [David Mason, The Hudson Review]

"…One can hardly fail to notice the sensuality of Stephanos Papadopoulos' Lost Days.  Frequently through flashing (but not flashy) metaphor, Papadopoulos creates too a sense of the infinite and intangible aspects of the world…Papadopoulos is able to pay tribute to such poets as Montale, cavafy and Brodsky without ever seeming dwarfed or dominated by them."  [Anthony Haynes, The Tablet, London]

"Stephanos Papadopoulos has several qualities as a poet, one of the most conspicuous being his talent for the elegiac, his ability to bring to life memories and artefacts from times past, 'before the gods became a circus out of work'.  'Some things will not collapse,' he winks at Sextus Propertius, and, in his poetry, they don't.  'If I am to have a talent,' he writes, 'let it be this…and hold a vision true, to a moment's epiphany…'  Stephanos Papadopoulos has that talent."  Bengt Jangfeldt

"This first collection is a breath of meltemi, (wind) blowing away the stuffiness of so much current poetry…It is easy to see him following in Seferis's footsteps but in the landscape of our own time…There is sometimes a nicely melancholy tone to Papadopoulos's work which puts him in the great tradition of poetic sorrows.  But the elegance and flair in these poems makes the reader look forward to his next volume.   Leviathan is wise to publish him."
						[Anne Born, Tears in the Fence]

"…When I first read Lost Days by Stephanos Papadopoulos, I was struck not only by the quality of the poetry itself but also by the atmosphere of universality that permeates the book.  While the diction remains American, the poems move with great ease from Paris to Greece, to Sweden to New York. This tone and attitude denote of course, not a school of art but a testimony of a life's experience."    Katerina Anghelaki-Rooke

"…A streetwise, well-traveled 'penseroso'.  He has a distinctive body of subject matter.  He has a sharp eye…work so exceptionally rich in atmosphere and observation."     [Robert Saxton, Poetry Review]

"...In his poetry, the melancholy of the modern finds its beauty in loss itself. Papadopoulos catches this beauty in poem after poem, while his poetry swims for joy in the Atlantic, Mediterranean and Aegean. This beautiful contradiction makes [Hotel-Dieu] a great pleasure to read and reread..."       [Stanley Moss]

Awards
The 2014 Jeannette Haien Ballard Writer's Prize

Civitella Ranieri Fellowship 2010

References
<author website >
<Sheep Meadow Press >
<University Press of New England >
<Rattapallax Press >
<Babel Festival >
<Poets and Writers >

1976 births
Living people
People from North Carolina
American male poets
American writers of Greek descent
21st-century American poets
21st-century American male writers